Giorgi Maisuradze (born 1970 in Tbilisi), studied History, Philosophy, and the History of Culture in Tbilisi, Saarbrücken and Berlin Universities. He has worked at Berlin Literary and Culture Research Centre since 2008. Maisuradze received his Ph.D. in Philosophy at Berlin Humboldt University in 2009. He has been Professor at Ilia State University Tbilisi since 2014.

List of  publications
2019 - Other Language, Indigo Publishing, Tbilisi 
2015 - Sonniges Georgien. Figuren des Nationalen im Sowjetimperium (co-autor Franziska Thun-Hohenstein), Kulturverlag Kadmos, Berlin.
2013 – Orthodox Ethics and the Spirit of Unfreedom, Bakur Sulakauri Publishing House, Tbilisi.
2013 – Genese und Genealogie. Zur Bedeutung und Funktion des Ursprungs in der Ordnung der Genealogie, Kulturverlag Kadmos, Berlin. (thesis,   Berlin, Humboldt-Univ.  
2013 – Kill Tbilisi, Bakur Sulakauri Publishing House, Tbilisi.
2012 – Lost Contexts
2011 – Closed Society and its Guardians 
2011 – Apocalyptic Beast
1998 – Gender and Civilization

Literary Prizes
2012 – Saba Literary Prize for the Best Essays and Documentary Prose of the Year (The Closed Society and its Watchmen).
2013 - Saba Literary Prize for the Best Essays and Documentary Prose of the Year (Lost contexts)

Apocalyptic Beast
(Annotation)
The whole series of minimalist novels written over the course of 6 years (between 1993–1998) based on the experiment started by the author while studying in Germany, which later continued in Georgia. The cycle of parody texts began with the first novel the 9th Symphony. The prototypes were the author’s friends, Georgians living with him in a small cottage in one of the German villages. While searching for new forms to express his ideas, the author had started an unintentional linguistic experiment – personal feelings and concrete stories connected with friends were developed by mixing them with the author’s favorite literary characters and plots. Notably, these were times when the author practically did not have any information on postmodernist literature.

References

Cultural academics
Novelists from Georgia (country)
Living people
Academic staff of Ilia State University
1970 births